Garino is a surname. Notable people with the surname include:

Emmanuelle Bayamack-Tam, née Emmanuelle Garino (born 1966), French writer
Patricio Garino (born 1993), Argentine basketball player
Silvia Garino (born 1998), Italian badminton player

See also
Marino (name)
Garino, Perm Krai, a village in Russia